In mathematics, the term linear function refers to two distinct but related notions:
 In calculus and related areas, a linear function is a function whose graph is a straight line, that is, a polynomial function of degree zero or one. For distinguishing such a linear function from the other concept, the term affine function is often used.
 In linear algebra, mathematical analysis, and functional analysis, a linear function is a linear map.

As a polynomial function 

In calculus, analytic geometry and related areas, a linear function is a polynomial of degree one or less, including the zero polynomial (the latter not being considered to have degree zero).

When the function is of only one variable, it is of the form

If a > 0 then the gradient is positive and the graph slopes upwards.

If a < 0 then the gradient is negative and the graph slopes downwards.

For a function  of any finite number of variables, the general formula is

and the graph is a hyperplane of dimension .

A constant function is also considered linear in this context, as it is a polynomial of degree zero or is the zero polynomial. Its graph, when there is only one variable, is a horizontal line.

In this context, a function that is also a linear map (the other meaning) may be referred to as a homogeneous linear function or a linear form.  In the context of linear algebra, the polynomial functions of degree 0 or 1 are the scalar-valued affine maps.

As a linear map 

In linear algebra, a linear function is a map f between two vector spaces s.t.

In other terms the linear function preserves vector addition and scalar multiplication.

Some authors use "linear function" only for linear maps that take values in the scalar field; these are more commonly called linear forms.

The "linear functions" of calculus qualify as "linear maps" when (and only when) , or, equivalently, when the above constant  equals zero.  Geometrically, the graph of the function must pass through the origin.

See also 
 Homogeneous function
 Nonlinear system
 Piecewise linear function
 Linear approximation
 Linear interpolation
 Discontinuous linear map
 Linear least squares

Notes

References 
 Izrail Moiseevich Gelfand (1961), Lectures on Linear Algebra, Interscience Publishers, Inc., New York. Reprinted by Dover, 1989. 
 Thomas S. Shores (2007), Applied Linear Algebra and Matrix Analysis, Undergraduate Texts in Mathematics, Springer. 
James Stewart (2012), Calculus: Early Transcendentals, edition 7E, Brooks/Cole. 
 Leonid N. Vaserstein (2006), "Linear Programming", in Leslie Hogben, ed., Handbook of Linear Algebra, Discrete Mathematics and Its Applications, Chapman and Hall/CRC, chap. 50.  

Polynomial functions